Syd Francis (20 February 1913 – 19 October 2009) was an  Australian rules footballer who played with Hawthorn in the Victorian Football League (VFL).

Notes

External links 

1913 births
2009 deaths
Australian rules footballers from Melbourne
Hawthorn Football Club players